The Pueblo Historical Aircraft Society (PHAS), Pueblo, Colorado hosts a large collection of military aircraft in Colorado, United States through the operation of the Weisbrod Museum and the International B-24 Memorial Museum, together as the Pueblo Weisbrod Aircraft Museum.

The Society is a volunteer group of ex-military and civilian personnel who manage and operate the aircraft display as well as repairing and restoring the aircraft. The Society is open to all who wish to help preserve the aviation history in Pueblo County and Pueblo, Colorado.

See also
 CAF Rocky Mountain Wing Museum, Grand Junction, CO
 Colorado Aviation Historical Society, Denver, CO
 Peterson Air and Space Museum, Colorado Springs, CO
 Pueblo Weisbrod Aircraft Museum (combined Weisbrod and B-24 International Museums), Pueblo, CO
 Spirit of Flight Center, Lafayette, CO
 Vintage Aero Flying Museum, Hudson, CO
 Wings Over the Rockies Air and Space Museum, Denver, CO
 List of aviation historical societies

References

External links
 Pueblo Weisbrod Aircraft Museum

Non-profit organizations based in Colorado
Aerospace museums in Colorado
Pueblo County, Colorado
Historical societies in Colorado
Aviation organizations based in the United States
History of aviation